Raúl the Third (born 1976) is a Mexican American artist and illustrator.

Life and career

Raúl González was born in El Paso. His father was from that town while his mother was from the neighboring Mexican city of Juárez. Raúl spent his childhood in both cities. In addition to his extensive work as a painter (which has been exhibited in New York, Boston, and Los Angeles), Raúl is a comic book and graphic novel illustrator. He works on the SpongeBob SquarePants comic, among other titles.

In 2019, Kwame Alexander's new imprint Versify (part of Houghton Mifflin Harcourt) will launch a series of bilingual children's books written and illustrated by Raúl.

Raúl resides with his wife and son in Medford, Massachusetts.

Raúl is represented by Jennifer Laughran of Andrea Brown Literary Agency.

Awards and honors
 Bank Street Children's Book Committee's Best Book of the Year in 2022 for Stuntboy, in the Meantime, authored by Jason Reynolds.
 Bank Street Children's Book Committee's Best Book of the Year in 2022 for Tag Team (El Toro & Friends series).
 Pura Belpré Illustrator Winner in 2021 for ¡Vamos! Let’s Go Eat.
 Bank Street Children's Book Committee's Best Book of the Year in 2021 for ¡Vamos! Let’s Go Eat.
 Pura Belpré Illustrator Honor in 2020 for ¡Vamos! Let’s Go to the Market. 
 Bank Street Children's Book Committee's Best Book of the Year in 2021 for ¡Vamos! Let’s Go to the Market.
 Pura Belpré Illustrator Winner in 2017 for Lowriders to the Center of the Earth.
 Texas BlueBonnet award nomination in 2016-2017 for Lowriders in Space. 
 The Brother Thomas Fellowship in 2015.
 Voted Boston's best visual artist for 2010 by readers of The Boston Phoenix.
 Artadia Foundation for Art and Culture award in 2009.

Works
AS ILLUSTRATOR
 Stuntboy, in the Meantime. Written by Jason Reynolds. New York, NY: Atheneum/Caitlyn Dlouhy Books, 2021. (Forthcoming.)
 Clockwork Curandera, Vol. 1: The Witch Owl Parliament. Written by David Bowles. New York, NY: Tu Books, 2021. (Forthcoming.) 
 Lowriders: Blast from the Past. Written by Cathy Camper. San Francisco: Chronicle Books, 2018.
 Lowriders to the Center of the Earth. Written by Cathy Camper. San Francisco: Chronicle Books, 2016.
 Lowriders in Space. Written by Cathy Camper. San Francisco: Chronicle Books, 2014.

AS AUTHOR AND ILLUSTRATOR
 Training Day. New York: Versify (Houghton Mifflin Harcourt), 2021.
 Tag Team. New York: Versify (Houghton Mifflin Harcourt), 2021.
 ¡Vamos! Let’s Go Eat. New York: Versify (Houghton Mifflin Harcourt), 2020.
 ¡Vamos! Let’s Go to the Market. New York: Versify (Houghton Mifflin Harcourt), 2019.

References

External links
 

American writers of Mexican descent
1976 births
Living people
Writers from El Paso, Texas
Artists from El Paso, Texas
People from Medford, Massachusetts